The Ambassador of the United Kingdom to Bosnia and Herzegovina is the United Kingdom's foremost diplomatic representative in Bosnia and Herzegovina, and head of the UK's diplomatic mission in Sarajevo.  The official title is His Britannic Majesty's Ambassador to Bosnia and Herzegovina.

List of heads of mission

Ambassadors to Bosnia and Herzegovina
1992–1994: Robert Barnett
1994–1996: Bryan Hopkinson
1996–1998: Charles Crawford
1998–2001: Graham Hand
2001–2005: Ian Cliff
2005–2008: Matthew Rycroft
2008–2011: Michael Tatham
2011–2014: Nigel Casey
2014–2018: Edward Ferguson

2018–2022: Matthew Field
2022–: Julian Reilly

References
Previous Ambassadors, UK in Bosnia and Herzegovina via The National Archives

External links
UK and Bosnia and Herzegovina, gov.uk

Bosnia and Herzegovina
 
United Kingdom